Highgate Hill may refer to:

 Highgate Hill, a street and locality in Highgate, London, United Kingdom
 Highgate Hill, Queensland, a suburb of Brisbane, Australia
 Highgate Hill, earlier name of Highgate, Western Australia, a Perth suburb